NeHo Likors is a Togolese brand of flavored sodabi.

References 

Food and drink companies of Togo